Fetal alcohol spectrum disorder is a continuum of permanent birth defects caused by maternal consumption of alcohol during pregnancy.

FASD may also refer to:

 Franklin Area School District, a school system located in Franklin, Pennsylvania
 Freeport Area School District, a Pennsylvania school system